Nanhai may refer to:

Nanhai, the Chinese name for the South China Sea, one of the Four Seas
Nanhai Commandery, the former Chinese administration over Liangguang
Nanhai, the Chinese name for the South China Sea Islands
The Nanhai I, a Chinese wreck from the Southern Song dynasty raised in 2007
 Nanhai, a lake in the Zhongnanhai complex in Beijing
Nanhai Academy, a collection of cultural and educational facilities located on Nanhai Road in Taipei, Taiwan
Nanhai District, Foshan, Guangdong
Nanhai, Hubei (zh), town in Songzi, Hubei
Nanhai Township (zh), subdivision of Pingtan County, Fujian
Nanhai Subdistrict, Maoming (zh), in Maogang District, Maoming, Guangdong
Nanhai Subdistrict, Zhumadian (zh), in Yicheng District, Zhumadian, Henan

See also
South Sea (disambiguation)
Nankai (disambiguation)
Donghai (disambiguation) ("East Sea")
Beihai (disambiguation) ("North Sea")
Xihai (disambiguation) ("West Sea")
Namhae (disambiguation), the Korean cognate of Nanhai